Yanick Lehoux (born April 8, 1982) is a Canadian professional ice hockey forward who is currently an unrestricted free agent. He most recently played for Malmö Redhawks of the Swedish HockeyAllsvenskan.

Lehoux was born in Montreal, Quebec. As a youth, he played in the 1996 Quebec International Pee-Wee Hockey Tournament with the Rive-Nord Elites minor ice hockey team.

He was drafted by the Los Angeles Kings, 86th overall, in the 2000 NHL Entry Draft. After four seasons within the Kings organization, he attended the Phoenix Coyotes training camp, but was quickly reassigned to the AHL. On July 25, 2008, he was signed by the Montreal Canadiens as an unrestricted free agent to a one-year contract. He was not offered an extension with the Montreal Canadiens.

On July 7, 2009 Lehoux signed for the Swedish club Södertälje SK of the Elitserien.

Career statistics

Transactions
 June 24, 2000 - Drafted by the Los Angeles Kings in the 3rd round, 86th overall.
 November 5, 2005 - Claimed off waivers by the Phoenix Coyotes.
 November 25, 2005 - Claimed off waivers by the Los Angeles Kings.
 March 9, 2006 - Traded to the Phoenix Coyotes for Tim Jackman.
 July 25, 2008 - Signed as an unrestricted free agent by the Montreal Canadiens.
 July 13, 2011 - Signed as an unrestricted free agent by Adler Mannheim (Ger)

References

External links

1982 births
Living people
Adler Mannheim players
HC Ambrì-Piotta players
Baie-Comeau Drakkar players
EHC Basel players
Canadian ice hockey centres
Genève-Servette HC players
Hamilton Bulldogs (AHL) players
Los Angeles Kings draft picks
Malmö Redhawks players
Manchester Monarchs (AHL) players
Phoenix Coyotes players
San Antonio Rampage players
Södertälje SK players
Ice hockey people from Montreal
Canadian expatriate ice hockey players in Germany
Canadian expatriate ice hockey players in Switzerland
Canadian expatriate ice hockey players in Sweden